Majed Al-Najrani (born 25 January 1993) is a Saudi Arabian professional footballer who plays as an attacking midfielder for Al-Kholood.

Honours
Al-Qadsiah
 First Division: 2014–15

Al-Hilal
 Saudi Professional League: 2016–17, 2017–18
 King Cup: 2017

References

Living people
1993 births
People from Khobar
Association football midfielders
Saudi Arabia youth international footballers
Saudi Arabian footballers
Al-Qadsiah FC players
Al Hilal SFC players
Al-Fayha FC players
Ettifaq FC players
Al-Kholood Club players
Saudi First Division League players
Saudi Professional League players